Confusion (German: Verwirrung der Gefühle), also known in English under the titles Confusion of Feelings or Episode in the Early Life of Privy Councillor D. is a 1927 novella by the Austrian writer Stefan Zweig. It tells the story of a student and his friendship with a professor. It was originally published in the omnibus volume Conflicts: Three Tales, together with two other Zweig novellas, Twenty-Four Hours in the Life of a Woman and Untergang eines Herzens. It was included on Le Monde's 100 Books of the Century list.

Plot 
Roland, the narrator, begins the story after he becomes an English professor years after the central action takes place. Roland explains that he was a poor student and how he would end up intoxicated on the streets of Berlin. His father then sends him off to university in the country.

Confusion is the account of [...] Roland, who has become enamored of the intellectual, bewildering, and isolated world of his greatest idol — his college professor. Roland gravitates toward the secluded home of his professor, the seclusion prompted by the fear of having his secret revealed. The novella, referencing the Greats (writers and philosophers alike) blurs all three of the greatest distinctions of love of the Ancient Greeks: Philia, Èros, and Agápe, although the novella does not address them explicitly.”

See also
 1927 in literature
 Austrian literature

References

1927 German-language novels
Austrian novels
Novellas by Stefan Zweig
Novels with gay themes